The demographic characteristics of the population of Bolivia are known from censuses, with the first census undertaken in 1826 and the most recent in 2012. The National Institute of Statistics of Bolivia (INE) has performed this task since 1950. The population of Bolivia in 2012 reached 10 million for the first time in history. The population density is 9.13 inhabitants per square kilometer, and the overall life expectancy in Bolivia at birth is 68.2 years. The population has steadily risen from the late 1800s to the present time. The natural growth rate of the population is positive, which has been a continuing trend since the 1950s; in 2012, Bolivia's birth rate continued to be higher than the death rate. Bolivia is in the third stage of demographic transition. In terms of age structure, the population is dominated by the 15–64 segment. The median age of the population is 23.1, and the gender ratio of the total population is 0.99 males per female.

Bolivia is inhabited mostly by Mestizo, Quechua and Aymara, while minorities include 37 indigenous groups (0.3% average per group). Spanish, Quechua, Aymara, Guarani languages, as well as 34 other native languages are the official languages of Bolivia. Spanish is the most-spoken language (60.7%) within the population. The main religions of Bolivia are the Catholic Church (81.8%), Evangelicalism (11.5%), and Protestantism (2.6%). There is a literacy rate of 91.2%. An estimated 7.6% of the country's gross domestic product (GDP) is spent on education. The average monthly household income was Bs.1,378 ($293) in 1994. In December 2013 the unemployment rate was 3.2% of the working population. The average urbanization rate in Bolivia is 67%.

Population

The first true estimate of the population of Bolivia came in 1826, in which 997,427 inhabitants were estimated. This number was calculated from the 1796 census organized by Francisco Gil de Taboada, which consisted of several Bolivian cities. The first modern census was completed in 1831, and ten have been completed since then. The organizer of Bolivia's censuses has changed throughout the years—Andrés de Santa Cruz (1831), The Bolivian Statistical Office (1835, 1854, 1882), The Bolivian Statistical Commission (1845), The National Immigration Bureau and The Statistics and Geographic Propaganda (1900), and The Department of Statistics and Censuses (1950)—with the INE conducting the census since 1976. The national census is supposed to be conducted every ten years, however, the 2012 census was late because of "climatic factors and the financing." The 2012 census was conducted on 21 November 2012, in which 10,027,254 inhabitants were in the country. The estimated cost of the census was $50 million.

With a population of 10.0 million in 2012, Bolivia ranks 87th in the world by population. Its population density is 9.13 inhabitants per square kilometer. The overall life expectancy in Bolivia is 65.4. The total fertility rate is 2.87 children per mother. Since 1950, the World Health Organization (WHO) estimates the birth rate exceeded the death rate of the country. The population of Bolivia has been increasing since 1900, and has only had a negative per annum growth rate twice in its history (1835 and 1882). Bolivia is in the third stage of demographic transition. There were 562,461 immigrants in Bolivia in 2012, with the most (40.5%) coming from Argentina. In 2008, there were 48,809 marriages in Bolivia, and 5,887 divorces throughout the country in 2011.

Vital statistics

Births and deaths

Fertility and Births
Total Fertility Rate (TFR) (Wanted Fertility Rate) and Crude Birth Rate (CBR):

Structure of the population 

Structure of the population (21 November 2012) (Census):

Life expectancy

Source: UN World Population Prospects

Ethnic groups

Languages

The official languages of Bolivia are Spanish (60.7%), Quechua (21.2%), Aymara (14.6), and Guaraní (0.6%), plus another 33 native languages. Originally only Spanish, Aymara, and Quechua were the official languages until the 2009 Constitution was passed. According to the 2001 census, 60.7% of the population over six years old are able to speak Spanish and/or speaks it as a native language.

Religion

In a 2012 Gallup poll, 87% answered affirmatively when asked "Is religion important in your daily life?" Christianity is the largest religion in Bolivia, with Roman Catholicism being the largest denomination.

Education 

The literacy rate in Bolivia is 94.98%.

Health 

Healthcare expenditured comprised only 4.9% of the GDP. According to the 2013 World Factbook, Bolivia ranks 161st in life expectancy with an average age of 68.2 years. In 2009, the World Factbook estimated 12,000 people are living in Bolivia with HIV/AIDS (0.2%) and less than 1,000 of that population died from it. In 2003, it was estimated by the World Health Organization (WHO) that 31.9% of the adult population (12–64) were smokers. According to 2008 WHO data, 17.9% of the population is obese. In 2011, there were 3,255 healthcare institutions, of which 1,134 are considered "first class" (medical personnel and registered nurses) by the Bolivian Ministry of Health Management. The hospitals employed an estimated 10,000 medical doctors in 2001.

In 2012, the causes of death in Bolivia were:

 Diseases of the circulatory system 13.72%
 Cancer 11.34%
 External causes of morbidity and mortality 10.79%
 Conditions originating in prenatal development 10.19%
 Gastrointestinal disease 10.18%

 Respiratory disease 9.92%
 Infectious and parasitic diseases 9.54%
 Endocrine, nutritional and metabolic diseases 6.74%
 Symptoms, signs, and abnormal clinical 6.23%
 Other 11.34%

Economic indicators

Personal income, jobs, and unemployment 
The average monthly income in 2016 was estimated in 4,319 Bs. This was a substantial increase from the average monthly income in 1994 of Bs.1,378 ($293).  Since May 2019, the minimum wage in Bolivia is Bs.2,122 ($307) per month. The unemployment rate in Bolivia in 2015 was 7.4%. There are an estimated 4.7 million workers in Bolivia. Of that population, 48% are considered to be employed in services, 32% are industrial workers (mining, smelting, petroleum, food and beverages, tobacco, handicrafts, clothing, jewelry), and 32% are agricultural workers (soybeans, coffee, coca, cotton, corn, sugarcane, rice, potatoes; Brazil nuts; timber). In comparison with other countries in South America, Bolivia's median equivalent household income in terms of the Purchasing Power Standard stands at $5,000, which ranks last in South America.

Urbanization and housing 
The 2012 census recorded a total of 3,158,691 households in Bolivia—an increase of 887,960 from 2001. In 2009, 75.4% of homes were classified as a house, hut, or pahuichi; 3.3% were apartments; 21.1% were rented out homes; and 0.1% were mobile homes. The urbanization rate of Bolivia is 67%.

Notes

References

External links
 Indigenous Peoples distribution map - Bolivian  Virtual Public Health Library official website